MS Bolette, formerly named Amsterdam, is a cruise ship owned and operated by Fred. Olsen Cruise Lines, formerly named for the city of Amsterdam, capital of the Netherlands. She was co-flagship of the Holland America Line along with her sister ship Rotterdam.

The ship's fuel consumption is 140 tons (127 tonnes) or 39,500 US gallons (150 m³) of fuel per day at  speed.

In July 2020 it was announced that the ship had been sold to Fred. Olsen Cruise Lines for delivery in September 2020 and is expected to be renamed MS Bolette and operate mainly in Europe.

References

External links
 
 Official website
 Professional photographs from shipspotting.com
 
 Current position at MarineTraffic
 MS Amsterdam accidents & incidents from Cruise Minus.

Ships of the Holland America Line
Ships built in Italy
Ships built by Fincantieri
2000 ships